Te Sigo Esperando is the fourth album (first Spanish language) by Brenda K. Starr. It was released in early 1997, and produced by Humberto Ramirez. It features the major hit single, "Herida", a cover of Myriam Hernandez's song which reached number-one on the Latin Tropical Airplay.

Background and recording
Recording for the album began after a label executive suggested that Starr record salsa music, as she had previously only recorded in the freestyle, pop and dance genres. While recording the album, Starr had problems with the pronunciation of certain words due to her inability to speak fluent Spanish.

Track listing

References

1997 albums
Brenda K. Starr albums